Blodgett is a village in Scott County, Missouri, United States. The population was 213 at the 2010 census.

History
Blodgett was settled as early as 1869. A post office called Blodgett has been in operation since 1870. The community has the name of Wells H. Blodgett, a railroad official. The town was incorporated in 1900.

Geography
Blodgett is located at  (37.004301, -89.526237).

Demographics

2010 census
As of the census of 2010, there were 213 people, 75 households, and 56 families living in the village. The racial makeup of the village was 92.96% White, 1.88% Black or African American, 0.47% Native American, 0.47% Asian, and 4.23% from two or more races. Hispanic or Latino of any race were 2.82% of the population.

There were 75 households, of which 48.0% had children under the age of 18 living with them, 50.7% were married couples living together, 13.3% had a female householder with no husband present, 10.7% had a male householder with no wife present, and 25.3% were non-families. 20.0% of all households were made up of individuals, and 8% had someone living alone who was 65 years of age or older. The average household size was 2.84 and the average family size was 3.20.

The median age in the village was 36.6 years. 30.5% of residents were under the age of 18; 10.3% were between the ages of 18 and 24; 27.8% were from 25 to 44; 21.6% were from 45 to 64; and 9.9% were 65 years of age or older. The gender makeup of the village was 51.6% male and 48.4% female.

2000 census
As of the census of 2000, there were 265 people, 98 households, and 77 families living in the village. The population density was 1,999.5 people per square mile (787.1/km2). There were 104 housing units at an average density of 784.7 per square mile (308.9/km2). The racial makeup of the village was 98.49% White, 0.38% African American, 0.38% from other races, and 0.75% from two or more races.

There were 98 households, out of which 36.7% had children under the age of 18 living with them, 66.3% were married couples living together, 7.1% had a female householder with no husband present, and 21.4% were non-families. 16.3% of all households were made up of individuals, and 11.2% had someone living alone who was 65 years of age or older. The average household size was 2.70 and the average family size was 3.01.

In the village, the population was spread out, with 27.2% under the age of 18, 7.9% from 18 to 24, 26.0% from 25 to 44, 26.0% from 45 to 64, and 12.8% who were 65 years of age or older. The median age was 38 years. For every 100 females, there were 100.8 males. For every 100 females age 18 and over, there were 87.4 males.

The median income for a household in the village was $33,194, and the median income for a family was $35,278. Males had a median income of $28,214 versus $16,750 for females. The per capita income for the village was $14,674. About 4.9% of families and 7.4% of the population were below the poverty line, including 12.1% of those under the age of eighteen and 4.9% of those 65 or over.

References

Villages in Scott County, Missouri
Villages in Missouri